Jan Cremer (born 20 April 1940, Enschede, Netherlands) is a Dutch author, photographer and painter. His best known work is the novel  ("I, Jan Cremer"; 1964) and the sequel Ik, Jan Cremer, tweede boek ("I, Jan Cremer, second book"; 1966). The publication of this book created scandal in the Netherlands because of its explicit sexual contents. He has since been active as photographer and painter.

In 1963 Cremer and painter Rik van Bentum made an obscure comic strip together about the Profumo scandal, which appeared in print two years later.

Public collections 
Among the public collections holding works by Jan Cremer are:
 Museum de Fundatie, Zwolle, The Netherlands
 Boijmans van Beuningen, Rotterdam, The Netherlands

References

Further reading

External links 
 
 
 Profile at Digital Library for Dutch Literature
 Lambiek Comiclopedia article about his life and career.
 Audio- and video fragments

1940 births
Living people
Dutch male painters
Dutch erotica writers
Dutch photographers
20th-century Dutch novelists
20th-century male writers
21st-century Dutch novelists
20th-century Dutch painters
21st-century Dutch painters
People from Enschede
Obscenity controversies in literature
Dutch male novelists
Dutch comics artists
Controversies in the Netherlands
Scandals in the Netherlands
20th-century Dutch male artists